Tiramisu is a 2002 Hong Kong romantic fantasy film directed by Dante Lam. It stars Nicholas Tse and Karena Lam in their first film collaboration.

Plot 
While a mail man (Nicholas Tse) delivers package to Jane Chan (Karena Lam), a dancer. Jane dies. He meets Jane's ghost on a subway train and begins a romantic relationship.

Cast
Nicholas Tse as Ko Fung
Karena Lam as Jane Chan (aka Chan Jing) 
Eason Chan as Buddy
Candy Lo as Tina
Vincent Kok as Lawrence
Chan Kit-ling as Sue
Kitty Yuen as Monica
Lawrence Chou as Doctor
Ng Siu-kong as Jane's father
Ting Chu-wai as Jane's mother
Lam Nag-man as Chan Wing
Bobby as Bobby
Lam Ching as Doctor's girlfriend
Lung Yuen-lam as Dancing teacher
Chiu Ho-yin as Jerry
Lo Ka-yu as Lydia
Dancers
Karen Chan
Ng Lai-hing
Chan Yuk-chu
Tam Kit-yu
Linda Choi
Tse Pui-kei
Chow Kam-yin
Wong Lai-hung
Lam San 
Yip Wing-yan 
Ma Cheung-ching 
Yiu Wing-chi 
Mai To 
Lee Kong as Old ghost husband
Wei Wei as Old ghost wife
Chow Yu-kei as Monica's boyfriend
Jazz band members
Wong Wing-kei
Yuen Chan-ting
Chan Man-tin 
Doddy P. Marcelo 
Lee Tok-fai
Ha Sek-hang
Siu Ping-lam as Newspaper editor
Jackie Lam as Accident victim
Ho Yung-mui as Minibus driver
Benny Tse as Truck driver
Wong Chui-yee as Convenience store clerk
Preliminary's judges
Chan Chuen-mo
Leung Man-wai
Yau Kwok-hung
Chun Lam 
Ng Yu-lit also as Final judge
Howard G. Harris as Final judge
Adelaide Chung as Final judge
Lisa Marie Bell-Jones as Final judge
John Nash as Final judge
Poon Long-fong as Kid in convenience store
Chan Chun-shan as Arrowed kid in convenience store
Shek Cheuk-kan as Kid playing piano
Lee Kin-shing as Pastor
Wong Yu-mei as Waitress
Man Kwai-pui as Waiter
Woo Chi-ming as Waiter
Sin Yan-kau as Waiter
Wong Ming-yan as Cleaner
Altan Au as Cleaner
Chan Wing-yin as Cleaner
Plato Lai as Cleaner
Sam Ho-lin as Cleaner
Couriers
Poon Yuk-sung 
Chan Wing-hei 
Chan Chi-san 
Chik Chi-fung 
Chan Wing-cheung 
Tsang Hing-cheung 
Chung Yung

References

External links
 

2002 films
Hong Kong romantic fantasy films
2000s ghost films
Films about ballet
2000s Cantonese-language films
2000s romantic fantasy films
Films directed by Dante Lam
Films about deaf people
2000s Hong Kong films